You Had Better Listen is a studio album by the American trumpeter Jimmy Owens and the pianist Kenny Barron, recorded in 1967 and released on the Atlantic label.

Reception 

In his review on AllMusic, Andrew Hamilton notes: "The Jimmy Owens-Kenny Barron Quintet doesn't condescend like some jazz artists tend to do; casuals can groove, relate, nod their heads in approval and feel righteous about it. Owens plays some beautiful trumpet scales, while Barron keeps busy banging chord progressions."

Track listing 
All compositions by Kenny Barron except where noted
 "You Had Better Listen" (Jimmy Owens) – 8:32
 "The Night We Called It a Day" (Matt Dennis, Tom Adair) – 5:11
 "Gichi" – 6:36
 "Love, Where Are You?" (James Moody) – 6:59
 "Carolina John" – 8:07

Personnel 
Jimmy Owens – trumpet, flugelhorn
Kenny Barron – piano
Bennie Maupin – tenor saxophone, flute
Chris White – bass
Rudy Collins (tracks 3 & 5), Freddie Waits (tracks 1, 2 & 4) – drums

References 

Kenny Barron albums
Jimmy Owens (musician) albums
1967 albums
Atlantic Records albums
Albums produced by Arif Mardin
Albums produced by Joel Dorn